Caenibacillus is a genus of bacteria from the family of Sporolactobacillaceae with one known species (Caenibacillus caldisaponilyticus).

References

Further reading 
 

 

Bacillales
Bacteria genera
Monotypic bacteria genera